Christopher St. Germain (1460–1540) was an English lawyer, legal writer, and Protestant polemicist.

Biography 
Christopher St. Germain was born in 1460 to Sir Henry and Anne St. Germain of Shilton, Warwickshire.

In 1528, St. Germain published his first book, Dialogus de fundamentis legum Anglie et de conscientia, known as The Doctor and Student after the titles of the two interlocutors, a doctor of divinity and a student of the laws of England, a barrister.  The book is a study of the relationship between the English common law and conscience.  It was the first study of the role of equity in English law, and set the terms for later discussions.  An English translation, probably done by St. Germain himself, appeared in 1530 or 1531. A second dialogue appeared in English in 1530, along with additional chapters referred to as the New Addicions. Although Doctor and Student was written as a discussion of conscience and law, its enduring popularity into the 19th century was a result of its clear introduction to common law concepts.  Until Blackstone published his Commentaries on the Laws of England in 1765-69, it was used as a student primer.

In 1532, St. Germain published the Treatise Concerning the Division between the Spiritualty and Temporalty, a pamphlet purporting to mediate between the laity and the clergy, but, as Thomas More argued in a response, his Apology, actually interested in increasing the divide.  St. Germain responded to More's Apology with the dialogue Salem and Bizance, to which More responded with his Debellation of Salem and Bizance in 1533.  The following year St Germain published his Additions of Salem and Bizance, the final text in the dispute between St. Germain and More.

A number of anonymous pamphlets, very likely written by St. Germain, appeared in the 1530s, before his death at the age of eighty in 1540.

References 

 Baker, J. H. “St German, Christopher (c.1460–1540/41)” In Oxford Dictionary of National Biography, edited by H. C. G. Matthew and Brian Harrison. Oxford: OUP, 2004. Online ed., edited by Lawrence Goldman, January 2008. http://www.oxforddnb.com/view/article/24493 (accessed 28 March 2008).

External links 
 Doctor and Student, ed. William Muchall 1874, from Lonang Institute

1460 births
1540 deaths
English lawyers
English legal writers
People from Warwickshire
15th-century English people
16th-century Protestants
16th-century English lawyers